Schoorel is a surname. Notable people with the surname include:

Maaike Schoorel (born 1973), artist
Thomas Schoorel (born 1989), Dutch tennis player